Raheen is a heritage-listed Italianate mansion located at 94 Studley Park Road in the Melbourne suburb of Kew, Victoria, Australia. Built in the 1870s, its name means "little fort" in Irish. Listed on the Victorian Heritage Register on 14 July 1982, Raheen is owned by members of the Pratt family and is the principal Australian residence for Anthony Pratt.

History
 
The first section of Raheen was commenced in 1870 with an extension added in 1884. It was designed by William Salway and built for Edward Latham of the Carlton Brewery. Sir Henry Wrixon, prominent Melbourne barrister and solicitor, later owned and resided at the property. Raheen was constructed as a two-storey house in the Italianate style with a four-storey tower over the entrance and single-storey extension. It was designed in an asymmetric and arcaded form, and is built of red brick with cement render. The property retains its garden layout, including an Italianate garden, outbuildings, fence and gates, and internal features including the original stairwell, library, ballroom and cast iron tower stairs.

In 1917 Raheen was purchased by the Roman Catholic Archdiocese of Melbourne and became the official residence of Archbishop Daniel Mannix, as well as four other Roman Catholic Archbishops of Melbourne. In 1981 the Church sold the property and it again reverted to a private residence.

It was purchased in 1981 by the Australian businessman Richard Pratt and his family. Pratt and his wife, Jeanne, extensively renovated the house and gardens, including the addition of a new wing designed by Glen Murcutt. The house and gardens are occasionally opened for charitable events. Subsequent to Pratt's death in 2009, his son, Anthony, in 2016 initiated renovations to Raheen. Prior to the renovations, Raheen was assessed as having an approximate value of 100 million.

Historical significance 
Raheen is of historic and architectural significance to the State of Victoria.
 
Raheen is of historic importance because of its association with Melbourne's elite businessmen through Latham and Wrixon, and illustrates not only the importance of the brewery business and the legal profession in nineteenth century Melbourne, but also the importance of a residence in indicating success and status in society. The house is of historic importance through its association with the Catholic Church and illustrates the status sought by church hierarchy for Melbourne's Catholics and the Church prior to the mid-twentieth century. It is also historically important because of its association with Archbishop Dr Daniel Mannix who played a significant role within the Melbourne Archdiocese, as also in Melbourne politics particularly during the conscription debates of the First World War.

Raheen is architecturally important in exhibiting an unusual integration of features in the combination of red brick and cement rendering. The house is architecturally important in exhibiting good design and aesthetic characteristics of the Italianate style, as well as in internal features and garden design.

See also

List of heritage listed buildings in Melbourne

References

Houses in Victoria (Australia)
Houses in Melbourne
Italianate architecture in Melbourne
Heritage-listed buildings in Melbourne
Buildings and structures completed in the 1870s
1870s establishments in Australia
Buildings and structures in the City of Boroondara